Brynteg is a village in the community of Broughton, in Wrexham County Borough, Wales.

Wrexham County Borough
Communities in Wrexham County Borough
Villages in Wrexham County Borough